Festuca gracillima is a species of grass in the family Poaceae. This species is native to southern Argentina, and southern Chile. It is perennial and prefers temperate biomes. Festuca gracillima was first described in 1847.

References

gracillima
Plants described in 1847
Taxa named by Joseph Dalton Hooker
Flora of Chile
Flora of Argentina